Heyrod is a village in Tameside, Greater Manchester, England, between Stalybridge and Mossley. Historically in Lancashire, Heyrod was subsumed into the Municipal Borough of Stalybridge in 1881, a local government district which became part of the administrative county of Cheshire in 1889.

Heyrod is the site of the former Hartshead Power Station.

There is a village hall.

See also
Huddersfield Narrow Canal Pylon

References

Geography of Tameside
Villages in Greater Manchester